This is a list of butterflies of Eswatini. About 312 species are known from Eswatini (formerly Swaziland), none of which are endemic.

Papilionidae

Papilioninae

Papilionini
Papilio nireus lyaeus Doubleday, 1845
Papilio dardanus cenea Stoll, 1790
Papilio constantinus Ward, 1871
Papilio demodocus Esper, [1798]
Papilio echerioides Trimen, 1868
Papilio euphranor Trimen, 1868
Papilio ophidicephalus ayresi van Son, 1939

Leptocercini
Graphium antheus (Cramer, 1779)
Graphium policenes (Cramer, 1775)
Graphium colonna (Ward, 1873)
Graphium porthaon (Hewitson, 1865)
Graphium angolanus (Goeze, 1779)
Graphium morania (Angas, 1849)
Graphium leonidas (Fabricius, 1793)

Pieridae

Coliadinae
Eurema brigitta (Stoll, [1780])
Eurema desjardinsii marshalli (Butler, 1898)
Eurema hecabe solifera (Butler, 1875)
Catopsilia florella (Fabricius, 1775)
Colias electo (Linnaeus, 1763)

Pierinae
Colotis amata calais (Cramer, 1775)
Colotis antevippe gavisa (Wallengren, 1857)
Colotis auxo (Lucas, 1852)
Colotis celimene amina (Hewitson, 1866)
Colotis danae annae (Wallengren, 1857)
Colotis euippe omphale (Godart, 1819)
Colotis evagore antigone (Boisduval, 1836)
Colotis evenina (Wallengren, 1857)
Colotis ione (Godart, 1819)
Colotis pallene (Hopffer, 1855)
Colotis regina (Trimen, 1863)
Colotis vesta argillaceus (Butler, 1877)
Colotis eris (Klug, 1829)
Colotis subfasciatus (Swainson, 1833)
Eronia cleodora Hübner, 1823
Eronia leda (Boisduval, 1847)
Pinacopterix eriphia (Godart, [1819])
Nepheronia argia variegata Henning, 1994
Nepheronia buquetii (Boisduval, 1836)
Nepheronia thalassina sinalata (Suffert, 1904)
Leptosia alcesta inalcesta Bernardi, 1959

Pierini
Appias epaphia contracta (Butler, 1888)
Appias sabina phoebe (Butler, 1901)
Pontia helice (Linnaeus, 1764)
Mylothris agathina (Cramer, 1779)
Mylothris rueppellii haemus (Trimen, 1879)
Dixeia charina (Boisduval, 1836)
Dixeia pigea (Boisduval, 1836)
Dixeia spilleri (Spiller, 1884)
Belenois aurota (Fabricius, 1793)
Belenois creona severina (Stoll, 1781)
Belenois gidica abyssinica (Lucas, 1852)
Belenois thysa (Hopffer, 1855)
Belenois zochalia (Boisduval, 1836)

Lycaenidae

Miletinae

Miletini
Lachnocnema bibulus (Fabricius, 1793)
Lachnocnema durbani Trimen & Bowker, 1887
Thestor basutus (Wallengren, 1857)

Poritiinae

Liptenini
Alaena amazoula amazoula (Boisduval, 1847)
Alaena amazoula ochroma Vári, 1976
Pentila tropicalis (Boisduval, 1847)
Baliochila aslanga (Trimen, 1873)
Cnodontes pallida (Trimen, 1898)
Cnodontes penningtoni Bennett, 1954

Epitolini
Durbania amakosa ayresi van Son, 1941
Deloneura millari Trimen, 1906

Aphnaeinae
Chloroselas mazoensis (Trimen, 1898)
Chloroselas pseudozeritis (Trimen, 1873)
Crudaria leroma (Wallengren, 1857)
Chrysoritis aethon (Trimen & Bowker, 1887)
Cigaritis ella (Hewitson, 1865)
Cigaritis mozambica (Bertoloni, 1850)
Cigaritis natalensis (Westwood, 1851)
Cigaritis phanes (Trimen, 1873)
Axiocerses tjoane (Wallengren, 1857)
Axiocerses amanga (Westwood, 1881)
Aloeides aranda (Wallengren, 1857)
Aloeides henningi Tite & Dickson, 1973
Aloeides swanepoeli Tite & Dickson, 1973
Aloeides damarensis mashona Tite & Dickson, 1973
Aloeides molomo (Trimen, 1870)
Aloeides taikosama (Wallengren, 1857)
Aloeides dryas Tite & Dickson, 1968
Aphnaeus hutchinsonii Trimen & Bowker, 1887

Theclinae
Myrina dermaptera (Wallengren, 1857)
Myrina silenus ficedula Trimen, 1879
Hypolycaena philippus (Fabricius, 1793)
Hemiolaus caeculus (Hopffer, 1855)
Leptomyrina hirundo (Wallengren, 1857)
Leptomyrina gorgias (Stoll, 1790)
Leptomyrina henningi Dickson, 1976
Iolaus alienus Trimen, 1898
Iolaus mimosae rhodosense (Stempffer & Bennett, 1959)
Iolaus sidus Trimen, 1864
Iolaus pallene (Wallengren, 1857)
Iolaus trimeni Wallengren, 1875
Iolaus silarus Druce, 1885
Stugeta bowkeri tearei Dickson, 1980
Deudorix antalus (Hopffer, 1855)
Deudorix dinochares Grose-Smith, 1887
Deudorix diocles Hewitson, 1869
Deudorix penningtoni van Son, 1949
Deudorix vansoni Pennington, 1948
Capys alphaeus extentus Quickelberge, 1979
Capys disjunctus Trimen, 1895

Polyommatinae

Lycaenesthini
Anthene amarah (Guérin-Méneville, 1849)
Anthene butleri livida (Trimen, 1881)
Anthene definita (Butler, 1899)
Anthene kersteni (Gerstaecker, 1871)
Anthene liodes (Hewitson, 1874)
Anthene millari (Trimen, 1893)
Anthene minima (Trimen, 1893)
Anthene otacilia (Trimen, 1868)
Anthene princeps (Butler, 1876)
Anthene talboti Stempffer, 1936

Polyommatini
Cupidopsis cissus (Godart, [1824])
Cupidopsis jobates (Hopffer, 1855)
Pseudonacaduba sichela (Wallengren, 1857)
Lampides boeticus (Linnaeus, 1767)
Uranothauma nubifer (Trimen, 1895)
Cacyreus lingeus (Stoll, 1782)
Cacyreus marshalli Butler, 1898
Cacyreus tespis (Herbst, 1804)
Cacyreus virilis Stempffer, 1936
Harpendyreus noquasa (Trimen & Bowker, 1887)
Leptotes brevidentatus (Tite, 1958)
Leptotes jeanneli (Stempffer, 1935)
Leptotes pirithous (Linnaeus, 1767)
Leptotes pulchra (Murray, 1874)
Tuxentius melaena (Trimen & Bowker, 1887)
Tarucus bowkeri transvaalensis Quickelberge, 1972
Tarucus sybaris (Hopffer, 1855)
Zintha hintza (Trimen, 1864)
Zizeeria knysna (Trimen, 1862)
Zizina antanossa (Mabille, 1877)
Actizera lucida (Trimen, 1883)
Zizula hylax (Fabricius, 1775)
Oraidium barberae (Trimen, 1868)
Azanus jesous (Guérin-Méneville, 1849)
Azanus mirza (Plötz, 1880)
Azanus moriqua (Wallengren, 1857)
Azanus natalensis (Trimen & Bowker, 1887)
Azanus ubaldus (Stoll, 1782)
Eicochrysops hippocrates (Fabricius, 1793)
Eicochrysops messapus mahallakoaena (Wallengren, 1857)
Euchrysops barkeri (Trimen, 1893)
Euchrysops dolorosa (Trimen & Bowker, 1887)
Euchrysops malathana (Boisduval, 1833)
Euchrysops osiris (Hopffer, 1855)
Euchrysops subpallida Bethune-Baker, 1923
Orachrysops lacrimosa (Bethune-Baker, 1923)
Freyeria trochylus (Freyer, [1843])
Lepidochrysops glauca (Trimen & Bowker, 1887)
Lepidochrysops ignota (Trimen & Bowker, 1887)
Lepidochrysops irvingi (Swanepoel, 1948)
Lepidochrysops patricia (Trimen & Bowker, 1887)
Lepidochrysops plebeia (Butler, 1898)
Lepidochrysops variabilis Cottrell, 1965

Nymphalidae

Libytheinae
Libythea labdaca laius Trimen, 1879

Danainae

Danaini
Danaus chrysippus orientis (Aurivillius, 1909)
Amauris niavius dominicanus Trimen, 1879
Amauris albimaculata Butler, 1875
Amauris echeria (Stoll, 1790)
Amauris ochlea (Boisduval, 1847)

Satyrinae

Melanitini
Aeropetes tulbaghia (Linnaeus, 1764)
Paralethe dendrophilus junodi (van Son, 1935)
Melanitis leda (Linnaeus, 1758)

Satyrini
Bicyclus anynana (Butler, 1879)
Bicyclus ena (Hewitson, 1877)
Bicyclus safitza (Westwood, 1850)
Heteropsis perspicua (Trimen, 1873)
Ypthima asterope (Klug, 1832)
Ypthima impura paupera Ungemach, 1932
Coenyra hebe (Trimen, 1862)
Physcaeneura panda (Boisduval, 1847)
Neita neita (Wallengren, 1875)
Cassionympha cassius (Godart, 1824)
Pseudonympha poetula Trimen, 1891
Stygionympha wichgrafi van Son, 1955
Dingana angusta Henning & Henning, 1996

Charaxinae

Charaxini
Charaxes varanes (Cramer, 1777)
Charaxes candiope (Godart, 1824)
Charaxes jasius saturnus Butler, 1866
Charaxes castor flavifasciatus Butler, 1895
Charaxes brutus natalensis Staudinger, 1885
Charaxes druceanus moerens Jordan, 1936
Charaxes bohemani Felder & Felder, 1859
Charaxes xiphares draconis Jordan, 1936
Charaxes cithaeron Felder & Felder, 1859
Charaxes etesipe tavetensis Rothschild, 1894
Charaxes achaemenes Felder & Felder, 1867
Charaxes jahlusa argynnides Westwood, 1864
Charaxes ethalion (Boisduval, 1847)
Charaxes phaeus Hewitson, 1877
Charaxes vansoni van Someren, 1975
Charaxes zoolina (Westwood, [1850])

Euxanthini
Charaxes wakefieldi (Ward, 1873)

Nymphalinae

Nymphalini
Vanessa hippomene (Hübner, [1823])
Vanessa cardui (Linnaeus, 1758)
Junonia hierta cebrene Trimen, 1870
Junonia natalica (Felder & Felder, 1860)
Junonia oenone (Linnaeus, 1758)
Junonia orithya madagascariensis Guenée, 1865
Junonia terea elgiva Hewitson, 1864
Protogoniomorpha anacardii nebulosa (Trimen, 1881)
Protogoniomorpha parhassus (Drury, 1782)
Precis antilope (Feisthamel, 1850)
Precis archesia (Cramer, 1779)
Precis ceryne (Boisduval, 1847)
Precis octavia sesamus Trimen, 1883
Precis tugela Trimen, 1879
Hypolimnas anthedon wahlbergi (Wallengren, 1857)
Hypolimnas misippus (Linnaeus, 1764)
Catacroptera cloanthe (Stoll, 1781)

Biblidinae

Biblidini
Byblia anvatara acheloia (Wallengren, 1857)
Byblia ilithyia (Drury, 1773)
Eurytela dryope angulata Aurivillius, 1899
Eurytela hiarbas angustata Aurivillius, 1894

Epicaliini
Sevenia boisduvali (Wallengren, 1857)
Sevenia morantii (Trimen, 1881)
Sevenia natalensis (Boisduval, 1847)

Limenitinae

Limenitidini
Cymothoe alcimeda marieps Rydon, 1994
Cymothoe coranus Grose-Smith, 1889
Pseudacraea boisduvalii trimenii Butler, 1874
Pseudacraea lucretia tarquinea (Trimen, 1868)

Neptidini
Neptis laeta Overlaet, 1955
Neptis saclava marpessa Hopffer, 1855

Adoliadini
Hamanumida daedalus (Fabricius, 1775)

Heliconiinae

Acraeini
Acraea cerasa Hewitson, 1861
Acraea acara Hewitson, 1865
Acraea anemosa Hewitson, 1865
Acraea boopis Wichgraf, 1914
Acraea horta (Linnaeus, 1764)
Acraea neobule Doubleday, 1847
Acraea rabbaiae perlucida Henning & Henning, 1996
Acraea satis Ward, 1871
Acraea nohara Boisduval, 1847
Acraea violarum Boisduval, 1847
Acraea aglaonice Westwood, 1881
Acraea axina Westwood, 1881
Acraea caldarena Hewitson, 1877
Acraea natalica Boisduval, 1847
Acraea oncaea Hopffer, 1855
Acraea aganice Hewitson, 1852
Acraea cabira Hopffer, 1855
Acraea encedon (Linnaeus, 1758)
Acraea serena (Fabricius, 1775)
Acraea esebria Hewitson, 1861
Acraea burni Butler, 1896
Acraea anacreon Trimen, 1868
Pardopsis punctatissima (Boisduval, 1833)

Vagrantini
Lachnoptera ayresii Trimen, 1879
Phalanta eurytis (Doubleday, 1847)
Phalanta phalantha aethiopica (Rothschild & Jordan, 1903)

Hesperiidae

Coeliadinae
Coeliades forestan (Stoll, [1782])
Coeliades libeon (Druce, 1875)
Coeliades lorenzo Evans, 1947
Coeliades pisistratus (Fabricius, 1793)

Pyrginae

Celaenorrhinini
Celaenorrhinus mokeezi separata (Strand, 1911)
Eretis djaelaelae (Wallengren, 1857)
Eretis umbra (Trimen, 1862)
Sarangesa motozi (Wallengren, 1857)
Sarangesa phidyle (Walker, 1870)
Sarangesa seineri durbana Evans, 1937

Tagiadini
Tagiades flesus (Fabricius, 1781)
Eagris nottoana (Wallengren, 1857)
Caprona pillaana Wallengren, 1857
Netrobalane canopus (Trimen, 1864)
Leucochitonea levubu Wallengren, 1857
Abantis paradisea (Butler, 1870)
Abantis tettensis Hopffer, 1855
Abantis venosa Trimen & Bowker, 1889

Carcharodini
Spialia asterodia (Trimen, 1864)
Spialia colotes transvaaliae (Trimen & Bowker, 1889)
Spialia confusa Evans, 1937
Spialia delagoae (Trimen, 1898)
Spialia depauperata australis de Jong, 1978
Spialia diomus ferax (Wallengren, 1863)
Spialia dromus (Plötz, 1884)
Spialia mafa (Trimen, 1870)
Spialia secessus (Trimen, 1891)
Spialia spio (Linnaeus, 1764)
Gomalia elma (Trimen, 1862)

Hesperiinae

Aeromachini
Kedestes barberae (Trimen, 1873)
Kedestes callicles (Hewitson, 1868)
Kedestes macomo (Trimen, 1862)
Kedestes mohozutza (Wallengren, 1857)
Kedestes wallengrenii (Trimen, 1883)
Parosmodes morantii (Trimen, 1873)
Acleros mackenii (Trimen, 1868)
Andronymus neander (Plötz, 1884)
Zophopetes dysmephila (Trimen, 1868)
Artitropa erinnys (Trimen, 1862)
Fresna nyassae (Hewitson, 1878)
Platylesches ayresii (Trimen & Bowker, 1889)
Platylesches moritili (Wallengren, 1857)
Platylesches neba (Hewitson, 1877)
Platylesches robustus Neave, 1910

Baorini
Zenonia zeno (Trimen, 1864)
Pelopidas mathias (Fabricius, 1798)
Pelopidas thrax (Hübner, 1821)
Borbo borbonica (Boisduval, 1833)
Borbo detecta (Trimen, 1893)
Borbo fallax (Gaede, 1916)
Borbo fatuellus (Hopffer, 1855)
Borbo gemella (Mabille, 1884)
Borbo holtzi (Plötz, 1883)
Parnara monasi (Trimen & Bowker, 1889)
Gegenes hottentota (Latreille, 1824)
Gegenes niso (Linnaeus, 1764)
Gegenes pumilio gambica (Mabille, 1878)

Heteropterinae
Metisella abdeli (Krüger, 1928)
Metisella metis paris Evans, 1937
Tsitana tsita (Trimen, 1870)

See also
List of moths of Eswatini
Wildlife of Eswatini

References

Seitz, A. Die Gross-Schmetterlinge der Erde 13: Die Afrikanischen Tagfalter. Plates
Seitz, A. Die Gross-Schmetterlinge der Erde 13: Die Afrikanischen Tagfalter. Text 

B

Eswatini
Eswatini
Butterflies